The Oyster Rocks are a close pair of small granite islands, with a combined area of about 6 ha, in south-eastern Australia.  They are part of Tasmania’s Tin Kettle Island Group, lying in eastern Bass Strait between Flinders and Cape Barren Islands in the Furneaux Group.  They are a conservation area.  The islands are part of the Franklin Sound Islands Important Bird Area, identified as such by BirdLife International because it holds over 1% of the world populations of six bird species.

Fauna
Recorded breeding seabird and wader species are little penguin, short-tailed shearwater, white-faced storm-petrel, Pacific gull, silver gull, sooty oystercatcher, Caspian tern and Cape Barren goose. Black-faced cormorants nest on the smaller western islet.  The metallic skink is present.

See also

 List of islands of Tasmania

References

Furneaux Group
Protected areas of Tasmania
Important Bird Areas of Tasmania
Islands of Tasmania